The Eric Andre Show is an American late-night talk show hosted by Eric André and formerly co-starring Hannibal Buress and Blannibal (played by James Hazley) for Cartoon Network late night programming block, Adult Swim. The series parodies low-budget public-access talk shows. It premiered on May 20, 2012, in the United States on Adult Swim. A total of 52 episodes have aired over the course of the show's first five seasons, additionally a live 27 minute special entitled "The Eric Andre New Year's Eve Spooktacular" aired on December 31, 2012. A second special titled "Eric Andre Does Paris" aired on February 18, 2018.

Series overview

Episodes

Pilot (2009)
Concerned that the show could not be sold on the script alone, André with co-host Hannibal Buress and directors Andrew Barchilon and Kitao Sakurai filmed a pilot episode, titled "Duh Air Ache On Dre Shoe," in 2009. Keith Crofford of Adult Swim said in 2013 that, on seeing the pilot, making the show "was pretty much a no-brainer from there."

Season 1 (2012)
For season 1, Andrew Barchilon and Kitao Sakurai are directors for all episodes; Eric André is the sole writer for all episodes as well. The show is played in a 4:3 aspect ratio.

Season 2 (2013)
Andrew Barchilon and Kitao Sakurai are directors for all episodes for season 2. Similarly, Eric André, Hannibal Buress, Andrew Barchilon, Kitao Sakurai, Dan Curry, Doug Lussenhop, Erica Oyama, Kevin Barnett, Tommy Blacha, Rory Scovel, Jesse Elias, and Eric Moneypenny have written all episodes of the season as well. The aspect ratio of the show is 16:9.

Season 3 (2014–15)

Season 4 (2016)

Season 5 (2020)

Specials
In addition to The Eric Andre New Years Eve Spooktacular and Eric Andre Does Paris, several other specials have been made by Adult Swim starring Eric André. These are not considered regular episodes of the show, but do contain The Eric Andre Show branding.

Spin-off (2019)

References

External links
 
 

Eric André Show, The
Eric André Show, The